Dr John Grieve FRS  FRSE FSA FRSA (1753–1805) was a Scottish physician who rose to be physician to the Russian royal family. He did much to foster international relationships between Russia and Scotland.

Life

He was born in Peeblesshire, south of Edinburgh, in 1753 the son of Dr  James Grieve (1700-1763), who had been physician to Empress Elizabeth of Russia. He studied medicine at Glasgow University graduating MA MD in 1777.

In 1778 he began service to the Imperial Russian Army, firstly based with the Voronezh Division. Returning to Britain in 1783 due to ill-health, he came to some fame through his attempt to introduce the Russian drink of koumiss (fermented mare's milk) to the country.

In 1784 he was elected a Fellow of the Royal Society of Edinburgh. His proposers were John Walker, Henry Cullen and James Hutton. He was elected a Fellow of the Royal Society of London in 1794.
In 1786 he relocated from Edinburgh to London.

In 1798 he returned to Russia as personal physician to Tsar Paul I and following the tsar's death in 1801, physician to Tsar Alexander I and his wife, Empress Elizabeth. In this role he would undoubtedly have come into contact with Matthew Guthrie, a fellow Scot of very similar background, who was the personal Councillor of the tsar and empress.

He died of a stroke in St Petersburg in Russia on 21 December 1805.

Family

He had a wife, Rebecca (Sophia), in St Petersburg in Russia. They had nine children. One son, Alexander, born in February 1804, only lived a few days.

His sister Jean Grieve married Dr James Mounsey, who also saw service to the Russian royal family.

References

1753 births
1805 deaths
Fellows of the Royal Society
Fellows of the Royal Society of Edinburgh
19th-century Scottish medical doctors
Alumni of the University of Glasgow
18th-century Scottish medical doctors